Ramiro Quintana (born 7 March 1977) is an Argentine Olympic show jumping rider. He competed at the 2016 Summer Olympics in Rio de Janeiro, Brazil, where he finished 40th in the individual and 10th in the team competition and participated at the 2015 Pan American Games, where he won a team silver and placed 39th individually.

Personal life 
In December 2013, Ramiro Quintana became a father when his then-girlfriend Georgina Bloomberg gave birth to a son, Jasper Michael Brown Quintana. He is not involved in the day-to-day raising of his son.

References

Living people
1977 births
Argentine male equestrians
Equestrians at the 2016 Summer Olympics
Olympic equestrians of Argentina
Equestrians at the 2015 Pan American Games
Pan American Games silver medalists for Argentina
Pan American Games medalists in equestrian
Medalists at the 2015 Pan American Games